Beloceras is a genus of ammonites included in the family Beloceratidae. These fast-moving nektonic carnivores lived in the Late Devonian period, from 379.5 to 376.1 Ma.

Similar and related genera include Eobeloceras, Mesobeloceras and Naplesites.

Species
Beloceras jorfense  Korn et al. 2011
Beloceras petterae  Yatskov 1990
Beloceras sagittarium  Sandberger and Sandberger 1851
Beloceras tenuistriatum  d'Archiac and de Verneuil 1842
Beloceras webbelense  Korn et al. 2011

Description
They are multilobate ammonoids, with a suture line composed up to 50 lobes.

Distribution
Fossils of species within this genus have been found in the Devonian sediments of Australia, France, Germany, Morocco and Spain.

References

Ammonites of Australia
Ammonitida
Devonian ammonites